Michelle Hamer is a contemporary visual artist based in Melbourne, Australia. Her work comments on the digital and physical world we inhabit. Her work is based on her own photographs of language within the environment. The slogans at the heart of Hamer’s work question how the language of our everyday life reflects bigger questions and issues we face both personally and as a society as a whole.

Hamer is primarily known for the way she uses hand-stitching, language and photography (her own and found)   to bring attention to social issues in a clever and satirical way. Her tapestries on perforated plastic grids She ‘combines texts, yarn and the digital world’. Concerned with “how universal our belief systems… have become”, she sources language found within the urban environment.

Style
Informed by her background in architecture, the work focuses on signage within urban landscapes. In particular, addressing ideas of intertopia, margins of error, interstitial and impermanent spaces represented through freeway signage and billboards.

Through tapestry she explores everyday limitations - capturing small intense sped-up moments. Using this traditional technique, Hamer explores an ironic romanticism present between tapestry and the digitalisation of imagery in contemporary society.

Hamer was awarded funding by the Australia Council in 2011 to undertake study in the USA.

Work

Stitched
Hamer's earliest works used wool and perforated plastic grids. The plastic grids are off the shelf products manufactured for the home craft, DIY market. Different colored wool is sourced, appropriate to each work. In 2014 Hamer was part of the Artists in Residence program at the Australian Tapestry Workshop where she was able to make yarns uniquely for her stitched works.

Hamer has also worked in larger stitched formats; using barrier tape to stitch through polypropylene debris mesh.

Ink on paper
Hamer has continued to develop her technique(s) using perforated plastic grids. In the medium of ink on paper, Hamer uses the plastic grid as a stencil template through which to make marks on the paper. The process of slowly rendering an image is common to both the stitched and ink works.

Installation
There are no words was first seen at the NGV, as part of Melbourne Now in early 2014. Alongside the exhibition, Hamer ran two programs which allowed the public to stitch with her, contributing to the making of a large series of pieces. There are no words includes over 200 stitched black and white pieces. Individual pieces have black text stitched on a background of white stitches. 
The first installation of There are no words was at Ararat Regional Art Gallery in 2015, where a site specific workshop was run prior to the installation. The unique footage from the workshop became one half of the installation.

References

External links
 

Living people
People from Melbourne
Textile artists
Australian women artists
1975 births
Women textile artists